The 2008 Final Four Women’s Volleyball Cup was first edition of the annual women's volleyball tournament, played by four countries from September 3–7, 2008 in Fortaleza, Brazil.

Competing nations

Squads

Preliminary round

September 3, 2008

September 4, 2008

September 5, 2008

Final round

Semifinals
September 6, 2008

Finals
September 7, 2008

Final ranking

Individual awards

Most Valuable Player

Best Scorer

Best Spiker

Best Blocker

Best Server

Best Digger

Best Setter

Best Receiver

Best Libero

Rising Star

References
 NORCECA Results

Final Four Women's Volleyball Cup
F
International volleyball competitions hosted by Brazil
Voll